Langdon is a surname. Notable people with the surname include:
 Charles C. Langdon, American politician
 Chauncey Langdon (1763–1830), American politician, lawyer and judge
 Craig Langdon (born 1957), Australian politician
 Darren Langdon (born 1971), Canadian former National Hockey League player
 David Langdon (1914–2011), English cartoonist
 Elisha Bassett Langdon (1827–1867), American brevet brigadier general and Ohio state representative
 Emma F. Langdon (1875–1937), American union activist
 George C. Langdon (1833–1909), mayor of Detroit (1878-1879)
 Harry Langdon (1884–1944), American comedian and silent-movie actor
 Jeffrey Langdon (born 1975), Canadian figure skater
 John Langdon (disambiguation)
 Jordan Langdon (born 1999), youngest mayoral candidate for Auburn, Alabama
 Julia Langdon (born c. 1946), British journalist, newspaper political editor and writer
 Lillian Langdon (1860–1943), American film actress of the silent era
 Margaret Langdon (died 2005), linguist
 Mary Joy Langdon (born 1951), British nun
 Michael Langdon (1920–1991), British bass singer
 Oliver Langdon, Canadian educator and former politician
 Olivia Langdon Clemens (1845–1904), wife of American writer and humorist Samuel Clemens (Mark Twain), maiden name Langdon
 Reuben Langdon, American actor and stuntman
 Richard Langdon (1729–1803), British cathedral organist
 Royston Langdon (born 1972), lead singer and bassist of the British glam rock band Spacehog
 Samuel Langdon (1723–1797),  American Congregational clergyman, educator and president of Harvard University
 Shawn Langdon, American drag racer and winner of the 2013 NHRA Top Fuel championship
 Stephen Herbert Langdon (1876–1937), American-born British Assyriologist
 Steven W. Langdon (born 1946), Canadian politician and economist
 Steve J. Langdon (born 1948), American anthropologist
 Steve Langdon (hockey player) (born 1953), Canadian former ice-hockey player
 Sue Ane Langdon (born 1936), American actress
 Thomas Langdon (cricketer) (1879–1944), English cricketer
 Thomas Langdon (MP) for Canterbury (UK Parliament constituency) 
 Tom Langdon (born 1994), Australian rules football player
 Trajan Langdon (born 1976), American retired basketball player
 Verne Langdon (1941–2011), American mask maker, musician, magician, circus clown, make-up artist, and wrestler
 Woodbury Langdon (1739–1805), American merchant, statesman, and justice

Fictional characters:
 Robert Langdon, fictional character created by author Dan Brown
 Tate Langdon (born 1977), fictional serial killer in the American Horror Story TV series
 Michael Langdon, the antichrist in the American Horror Story TV series